Symphyothrips is a genus of thrips in the family Phlaeothripidae.

Species
 Symphyothrips aberrans
 Symphyothrips alifanensis
 Symphyothrips caliginosus
 Symphyothrips concordiensis
 †Symphyothrips longicaudus
 Symphyothrips longicornis
 Symphyothrips punctatus
 Symphyothrips reticulatus

References

Phlaeothripidae
Thrips
Thrips genera